Tambaram taluk is a taluk of Chengalpattu district of the Indian state of Tamil Nadu. The headquarters of the taluk is the town of Tambaram. It comes under the Chennai Metropolitan Development Authority (CMDA) and it is a suburb of Chennai city.

History
Tambaram taluk was previously a part of the Kanchipuram district. After the bifurcation of Kanchipuram district, Tambaram taluk became a part of the Chengalpattu district.

Demographics
According to the 2011 census, the taluk of Tambaram had a population of 390,279 with 198,538  males and 191,741 females. There were 966 women for every 1000 men. The taluk had a literacy rate of 84. Child population in the age group below 6 was 19,191 Males and 18,718 Females.

Administration
The taluk is administered by the Tahsildar office located in Tambaram.

References 

Taluks of Chengalpattu district